The 1925 Grand National was the 84th renewal of the Grand National horse race that took place at Aintree near Liverpool, England, on 27 March 1925.

The race was won by Double Chance, a 100/9 shot ridden by jockey Major John Wilson and trained by Fred Archer, Jr. for owner David Goold.

Old Tay Bridge finished in second place, Fly Mask was third and future winner Sprig completed the course in fourth position. Thirty-three horses ran and all returned safely to the stables. One jockey was injured at the water-jump (16th fence) as his horse fell on him.

1925 was the first year a tape, known then as a 'gate', was used at the start line.

Finishing Order

Non-finishers

References

 1925
Grand National
Grand National
20th century in Lancashire